Linda Wong, born Linda Carol Seki (September 13, 1951 – December 17, 1987), was an American pornographic actress, and one of the first Asian Americans to become a star in the American adult film industry. In 1999, she was inducted into the XRCO Hall of Fame. She was Japanese by ethnicity.

Early life
Wong was raised in San Francisco, California. She was a former homecoming queen, and later went to college to earn a degree in dance. She worked as a ballerina and was married for a time to an attorney.

Career
Wong began nude modeling and after appearing in Hustler magazine, was approached to do adult films. She first broke into the adult film business in 1976 with Oriental Babysitter and The Jade Pussycat, in which she co-starred with Georgina Spelvin and John Holmes. According to Playboy's October 1977 pictorial "Ladies of Joy" and Playboy's 1980 Girls of Playboy 4, she worked as a masseuse in Las Vegas for a short time under the name "Linda Ching".

In 1981, she decided to retire. She returned four years later to star in The Erotic World of Linda Wong. She was planning yet another comeback in 1987 when she died of a drug overdose.

Awards
In 2011, Complex magazine ranked her at #25 in their list of "The Top 50 Hottest Asian Porn Stars of All Time."

Partial filmography
 Oriental Babysitter (1976)
 China Lust (1976)
 China DeSade (1977)
 Baby Face (1977)
 The Jade Pussycat (1977)
 Stormy (1980)
 Swedish Erotica 10 (1981)

See also
 Golden Age of Porn

References

External links
 
 
 
 Linda Wong Online FanClub

1951 births
1987 deaths
American pornographic film actresses
American pornographic film actors of Japanese descent
American pornographic film actors of Chinese descent
American people of Chinese descent
Drug-related deaths in California
Pornographic film actors from California
Sex workers drug-related deaths
20th-century American actresses